Landresse is a commune in the Doubs department in the Bourgogne-Franche-Comté region in eastern France.

Geography

Population

Notable people linked to the commune 
 Louis Pergaud, writer and author of La Guerre des boutons, was a teacher there
 Jean Perrot (1920-2012), archaeologist, born in Landresse

See also
 Communes of the Doubs department

References

External links

 Landresse on the intercommunal web site of the department 

Communes of Doubs